Chinese Table Tennis Association is a national non-governmental, nonprofit sports organization in the People's Republic of China. It represents China in the International Table Tennis Federation and the Asian Table Tennis Union, as well as the table tennis sports in the All-China Sports Federation.

See also
China Table Tennis Super League

External links
Official Website

National members of the Asian Table Tennis Union
Table Tennis
Table Tennis
Table tennis in China